Ahmet Ugur Alkan is a Turkish economist and the former dean of Faculty of Arts and Social Sciences at Sabancı University, Istanbul, Turkey. Alkan is a member of the Turkish Academy of Sciences.

External links
 Ahmet Alkan's page at Sabancı University

References 

Academic staff of Sabancı University
Turkish economists
Turkish academics
Living people
Year of birth missing (living people)
Sabancı University alumni